Trepanging is the act of collection or harvesting of sea cucumbers, known in Indonesian as trepang, Malay těripang, and used as food.
The collector, or fisher, of trepang is a trepanger.

Trepanging is comparable to clamming, crabbing, lobstering, musseling, shrimping and other forms of "fishing" whose goal is the acquisition of edible invertebrates rather than fish.

History 

To supply the markets of Southern China, Makassarese trepangers traded with the Aboriginal Australians of Arnhem Land from at least the 18th century or likely prior.  This Makassan contact with Australia is the first recorded example of interaction between the inhabitants of the Australian continent and their Asian neighbours.

This contact had a major impact on the Indigenous Australians.  The Makassarese exchanged goods such as cloth, tobacco, knives, rice and alcohol for the right to trepang coastal waters and employ local labour.  Makassar pidgin became a lingua franca along the north coast among different Indigenous Australian groups who were brought into greater contact with each other by the seafaring Makassan culture.

Archeological remains of Makassan contact, including trepang processing plants from the 18th and 19th centuries, are still found at Australian locations such as Port Essington and Groote Eylandt, and the Makasar-planted tamarind trees (native to Madagascar and East Africa).

Methods 
Slow-moving creatures related to sea stars and sea urchins, sea cucumbers are found on the sea floor.  As such, trepanging is accomplished by spearing, diving, dredging or simply picking the animals up by hand when they are exposed at low tide.

Traditionally, sea cucumbers were placed in boiling water before being dried and smoked before going to market.

Commerce 

Trepanging is an economically important activity in some areas, particularly Southeast Asia.  Sea cucumber is considered a delicacy in Far East countries such as Malaysia, China, Japan, and Indonesia.

Besides being valued for flavour-enhancing properties, sea cucumber is widely regarded as a stimulant and aphrodisiac.  There is evidence that its reputed medicinal properties may be true.

Based upon the belief in the healing properties of sea cucumber, pharmaceutical and cosmetics companies have developed pills, oils, and creams based on extracts.  The effectiveness of sea cucumber extract in tissue repair has been the subject of scientific study.

See also 

 Sama-Bajau peoples
 Gamat
 Carronade Island
 Makassan contact with Australia
 Pobasso
 MOU Box
 Padewakang, a type of perahu used by trepangers
 Patorani, another type of perahu used by trepangers

References 

Fishing techniques and methods
History of Australia before 1788
Echinoderms and humans
Sea cucumbers as food